List of handgun cartridges, approximately in order of increasing caliber.

Table of handgun cartridges

Other cartridges used in handguns 

Although not originally designed for handguns, several rifle and shotgun cartridges have also been chambered in a number of large handguns, primarily in revolvers like the Phelps Heritage revolver, Century Arms revolver, Thompson/Centre Contender break-open pistol, Magnum Research BFR, and the Pfeifer Zeliska revolvers. These include:

Gallery

See also 
Firearms
Table of handgun and rifle cartridges

References

Bibliography

External links 
GunDirectory.com: Gun Reviews, Reference Guide, and Classifieds
Hawks Handgun Cartridges
Thenumas Cartridge spreadsheet
Basics-Cartridges Used in Handguns
Ballistics By The Inch testing of handgun cartridges and relationship between barrel length and velocity.

Cartridges handgun
Pistol and rifle cartridges
Lists of gun cartridges

de:Liste Handfeuerwaffenmunition#Pistolenmunition